Jack Carey (January 23, 1927 – September 24, 2013) was a United States swing dancer, choreographer and judge.

In 1991 he was inducted into the Swing Dance Hall of Fame. He died in 2013.

References

American swing dancers
2013 deaths
1927 births